The Rob & Bessie Welder Wildlife Foundation or Welder Wildlife Refuge was established by the will of Robert H. Welder in 1954 with a grant of 7,800 acres (31.5 km2) of prime wildlife habitat adjacent to the Aransas River in northern San Patricio County, Texas, approximately seven miles north-east of Sinton, Texas.  The foundation is supported by oil and gas royalties, cattle, interest on investments, and contributions.  As of 2004, the foundation has assisted more than 300 graduate students from 66 universities.

Refs

External links
Welder Wildlife Foundation

Wildlife sanctuaries of the United States
Protected areas of Texas
Nature reserves in Texas
Protected areas of San Patricio County, Texas
1954 establishments in Texas
Protected areas established in 1954